Denis Vladimirovich Laktionov (born 4 September 1977) is a Russian football coach and a former player. He is the caretaker manager of Cypriot club Akritas Chlorakas. He became a naturalized South Korean citizen in 2003, and was known as Lee Seong-nam while playing for Seongnam Ilhwa Chunma.

Club career 

In December 2007 he returned to Russia and signed a two-year contract with Sibir Novosibirsk in the Russian First Division. He was released by Sibir in the summer 2008 and became a free agent. He re-signed with Sibir in the winter of 2008.

International career
While not being selected for the final Russian squad, Laktionov was involved in the training camp for the 2002 FIFA World Cup. Laktionov made his debut for Russia on 17 May 2002 in a friendly game against Belarus. He also played for the Olympic team.

Personal life
His cousin Aleksandr Laktionov was also a footballer. His son Nikita Laktionov made his debut as a professional footballer in 2019 at FC Rodina Moscow which Denis was managing.

References

External links
 

1977 births
Living people
Association football midfielders
Russian footballers
Russian expatriate footballers
Russia under-21 international footballers
Russia international footballers
Suwon Samsung Bluewings players
Seongnam FC players
Busan IPark players
FC Sibir Novosibirsk players
Gangwon FC players
K League 1 players
Expatriate footballers in South Korea
Sportspeople from Novosibirsk
South Korean people of Russian descent
Russian expatriate sportspeople in South Korea
Naturalized citizens of South Korea
Russian emigrants to South Korea
Russian Premier League players
FC Tom Tomsk players
Russian football managers
Russian expatriate football managers
Expatriate football managers in Latvia
Russian expatriate sportspeople in Latvia
Expatriate football managers in Cyprus
Russian expatriate sportspeople in Cyprus